German submarine U-805 was a Type IXC/40 U-boat built for Nazi Germany's Kriegsmarine during World War II.

Design
German Type IXC/40 submarines were slightly larger than the original Type IXCs. U-805 had a displacement of  when at the surface and  while submerged. She had two shafts and two  propellers.

U-805 was fitted with six  torpedo tubes (four fitted at the bow and two at the stern), 22 torpedoes, one  SK C/32 naval gun, 180 rounds, and a  Flak M42 as well as two twin  C/30 anti-aircraft guns. The boat had a complement of forty-eight.

Service history
U-805 was ordered on 10 April 1941 from DeSchiMAG Seebeckwerft in Geestemünde under the yard number 363. Her keel was laid down on 24 December 1942, and the U-boat was launched the following year sometime in October 1943. On 12 February 1944 she was commissioned into service under the command of Kapitänleutnant Richard Bernardelli (Crew 32) in the 4th U-boat Flotilla. She spent the next year as a training boat with the flotilla, then was transferred to the 33rd U-boat Flotilla and deployed on her one and only war patrol in March 1945. At the end of the war U-805 was operating in the West Atlantic as part of the Seewolf group, when she received orders to make for an Allied port in order to surrender. The U-boat reached Portsmouth, New Hampshire on 15 May 1945, where the crew surrendered and handed the boat over to the US Navy.

The US Navy took U-805 on several Victory Visits to ports on the east coast of the United States before sinking her off the coast in position  on 4 February 1946.

References

Bibliography

External links

World War II submarines of Germany
German Type IX submarines
1943 ships
U-boats commissioned in 1944
U-boats sunk in 1946
Ships built in Bremen (state)